Jalim (also called Jalim Senai) is a village/ Bauxite mining site in the Bishunpur CD block in the Bishnupur subdivision of the Gumla district in the Indian state of Jharkhand.

Geography

Location
Jalim is located at

Area overview
The map alongside presents a rugged area, consisting partly of flat-topped hills called pat and partly of an undulating plateau, in the south-western portion of Chota Nagpur Plateau. Three major rivers – the Sankh, South Koel and North Karo - along with their numerous tributaries, drain the area. The hilly area has large deposits of Bauxite. 93.7% of the population lives in rural areas.

Note: The map alongside presents some of the notable locations in the district. All places marked in the map are linked in the larger full screen map.

Demographics
According to the 2011 Census of India, Jalim had a total population of 880, of which 431 (49%) were males and 449 (51%) were females. Population in the age range 0–6 years was 180. The total number of literate persons in Jalim was 399 (57.00% of the population over 6 years).

(*For language details see Bishunpur block#Language and religion)

Bauxite mining
Bauxite and laterite (aluminium ore) is found in “villages of Amtipani, Langdatanr, Chirodih, Jalim, Narma, Bahagara and Gurdari of Bishunpur block, Langatanr, Lupungpat and Chota-agiatu in Chainpur block and Hanrup, Serengdag and Jalim in Ghaghra block. The total number of bauxite mines is twenty one”.

In Gumla district the mines are operated manually/ semi-mechanised methods.  After blasting, manual sorting and sizing of bauxite from the run of mine ore is practiced in the mine.

Jalim and Senai Bauxite Mining Project is operated by Hindalco Industries.

References

Villages in Gumla district
Mining communities in Jharkhand